James Beggs (January 6, 1924 – May 4, 2011) was an American rower. He competed in the men's coxed pair event at the 1952 Summer Olympics.

References

1924 births
2011 deaths
American male rowers
Olympic rowers of the United States
Rowers at the 1952 Summer Olympics
Sportspeople from Portland, Oregon